Three ships of the Royal Navy have been named Shamrock, after the plant:

 , a schooner built at Bermuda in 1808 and wrecked in 1811. She was the name-ship of her class of 10-gun schooners.
 , an unrated brig-sloop transferred to HM Revenue Service in 1833 and sold in 1867.
 , an  built in Sunderland, launched 1918 and scrapped in 1936.

Citations and references
Citations

References
 

Royal Navy ship names